Taki's Magazine, called Takimag for short, is an online magazine of politics and culture published by the Greek paleoconservative commentator and socialite Taki Theodoracopulos and edited by his daughter Mandolyna Theodoracopulos. Initially called Taki's Top Drawer, the site was redesigned and relaunched under its current title in March 2008 with a subsequent redesign in 2010. It has published articles by far-right figures such as Gavin McInnes and the white supremacist Jared Taylor; the white supremacist Richard Spencer was an early Taki's editor. It received criticism in 2013 after it published articles in support of the Greek neo-Nazi political party Golden Dawn.

History 
Founded on 5 February 2007, the intent of the site, according to Theodoracopulos, was to "shake up the stodgy world of so-called 'conservative' opinion." Theodoracopulos said: "Takimag is a libertarian webzine. We believe the best stories are smart, cheeky, and culturally relevant. We take our politics like we take life—lightly." Theodoracopulos, a "New York society gadfly" and the playboy son of a Greek shipping magnate, has been a controversial columnist in publications like The Spectator, and noted for his use of racial and ethnic slurs. Taki's drew note for its inclusion of white nationalist and white supremacist authors. Vox called it "openly racist" in 2016. New York magazine in 2017 said Taki's appealed to "hepcat paleoconservatives and cosmopolitan racists".

Taki's Magazine had Richard Spencer as its editor for about two years, through 2009; Spencer's tenure played a key role in marshaling and naming what would eventually become the alt-right. Indeed, Spencer first coined the term "alternative right" around 2008, for a headline he devised for an article by Kevin DeAnna about the development of a new, less neo-conservative, more racialist politics emerging in the conservative movement. This term was later adopted and shortened to "alt-right".

John Derbyshire was fired by National Review in 2012 after he wrote a derogatory column for Taki's Magazine responding to "the talk" given by American black parents to their children.

Gavin McInnes' Taki's column, which began around 2011, made casual use of racial and anti-gay slurs, as described by the Southern Poverty Law Center. In 2016, McInnes announced on the Taki's website the founding of his neo-fascist street-fighting group the Proud Boys.

Taki's Top Drawer 
The name Taki's Top Drawer also refers to a section which appeared in the New York Press. Edited by Theodoracopulos and Sam Schulman, it featured Taki's regular newspaper column, as well as contributions from other notable paleoconservatives, such as Alexander Boot, and libertarians, including George Szamuely. Scott McConnell has also contributed, and the site carries syndicated columns by Pat Buchanan and Michelle Malkin.

References

Paleoconservative publications
American political websites
American conservative websites
Criticism of journalism
News agencies based in the United States
American news websites
American journalism organizations
Magazines established in 2007
Online magazines published in the United States
Magazines published in New York City
Far-right publications in the United States